Hold On to Your Love may refer to:

"Hold On to Your Love" (Smokey Robinson song)
"Hold On to Your Love" (Taylor Hicks song)
"Hold On to Your Love" (Tom Chaplin song)

See also
 Hold On to Love (disambiguation)